Sarendy Vong (October 3, 1929 – April 17, 1975) was a Fleet Admiral in the Khmer Republic. He held his most prominent position as the head of the Khmer National Navy (MNK) from 1970 to 1975 and as a member of the Supreme Committee which ran the Khmer republic during the Phnom Penh siege.

Early and personal life
Sarendy Vong was born in Phnom Penh on October 3, 1929. During his childhood, he lived in the village of Mong in Battambang province. At age 11, after the death of his father, the incumbent village chief, he traveled to Phnom Penh with his older brother to finish his studies. After graduation, Sarendy commenced his military studies in France. In 1963, he married Nareine Saphon. The couple have had 3 children, Narendy (1963), Sirenda (1964) and Saphira (1966), now of French citizenship.

Military career

Education
Following graduation in 1954, Sarendy Vong received a scholarship to the naval school of Brest in France. He completed his military studies and upon his return to Cambodia in 1957, was appointed Commander of Ream naval base. In 1963, he left his post for a military fellowship in Monterey, California but departed following John F. Kennedy's assassination, 2 months before schedule. His internship was cancelled as a result of King Sihanouk's professed allegiance with the People's Republic of China during the Vietnam War. In 1968, Vong spent a 2-year internship in the prestigious École Militaire in Paris. Following his return to Phnom Penh, he was promoted to Capitaine de vaisseau and 2nd in commandment of the MRK.

Marine Nationale Khmère
In the wake of King Sihanouk's removal from power, the Royal Khmer Navy was re-designated as the Khmer National Navy. As a result, Vong ascended to the rank of Admiral of the fleet and replaced former superior Pierre Coedes as the head of the Naval forces. With the United States as allies, the newly proclaimed Khmer Republic received an influx of standardized equipment and crafts. By September 1974, the MNK saw its personnel size increase tenfold, with 16,500 men under Vong's command. Nowadays, Vong Sarendy is recognized as one of the most notable commanders of the Khmer National Navy.

Cambodian Coup of 1970
According to a currently declassified CIA report from August 14, 1970, a secret council named "The Revolutionary Committee" staged and planned the coup that led to the removal of Prince Sihanouk from power and to the creation of the Khmer Republic. Sarendy Vong was listed as one of the committee's twelve members.

Cambodian Civil War

During the Khmer rouge uprising, Vong Sarendy was credited for sustaining exemplary discipline and morale within his forces. On April 12, 1975, United States operation Eagle Pull evacuated all remaining U.S citizens from besieged Phnom Penh as well as acting president Saukham Khoy. Following his departure, a supreme committee, consisting of Sarendy Vong and six other high placing officials, was formed to govern the republic. On April 17, 1975, Phnom Penh was falling to Khmer Rouge forces. Vong's headquarters in the Chroy Changvar peninsula were encircled and a final phone call to head of state Sak Sutsakhan confirmed the dissolution of the supreme committee. Vong committed suicide as the insurgents entered his office; on the committee's 5th day in office.

Awards

In popular culture

Shadow Over Angkor
Sarendy Vong makes a short appearance in King Sihanouk's 1969 film: Shadow Over Angkor (Ombre sur Angkor). He portrays an officer in the Khmer Royal Navy. Ironically, the film is centered around a plot to overthrow the Cambodian Government.

Rogue Warrior
Sarendy appears in Richard Marcinko's book, Rogue Warrior, which includes an account of the Cambodian Civil War.

See also
Cambodian genocide
Cambodian Civil War
Khmer National Armed Forces
Khmer National Navy (MNK)
Vietnam War

References

1929 births
1975 deaths
Cambodian military personnel
People from Phnom Penh